Vladimir Vladimirovich Volodenkov (born 25 April 1972 in Leningrad) is an Olympic rower who competed for Russia in the three Olympic Games. He won bronze medal in the coxed eight competition 1996 Summer Olympics.

External links
sports-reference.com

1972 births
Living people
Russian male rowers
Rowers at the 1996 Summer Olympics
Rowers at the 2000 Summer Olympics
Rowers at the 2004 Summer Olympics
Olympic rowers of Russia
Olympic bronze medalists for Russia
Rowers from Saint Petersburg
Olympic medalists in rowing
World Rowing Championships medalists for Russia
Medalists at the 1996 Summer Olympics
European Rowing Championships medalists